Márta Vastagh Regős (born 22 October 1981) is a Hungarian alpine skier. She competed in two events at the 2002 Winter Olympics.

References

1981 births
Living people
Hungarian female alpine skiers
Olympic alpine skiers of Hungary
Alpine skiers at the 2002 Winter Olympics
Sportspeople from Miskolc
21st-century Hungarian women